Jérôme Pérez (born February 18, 1982 in Avignon) is a French professional footballer. He currently plays in the Championnat de France amateur for US Le Pontet.

Pérez played on the professional level in Ligue 1 for Olympique de Marseille and Ligue 2 for US Créteil-Lusitanos.

1982 births
Living people
Sportspeople from Avignon
French footballers
Ligue 1 players
Ligue 2 players
Olympique de Marseille players
US Créteil-Lusitanos players
US Pontet Grand Avignon 84 players
Association football defenders